Diana Trilling (née Rubin; July 21, 1905 – October 23, 1996) was an American literary critic and author, one of a group of left-wing writers known as the New York Intellectuals.

Background
Born Diana Rubin, she married the literary and cultural critic Lionel Trilling in 1929  after an extended stay in Paris with childhood friend Margaret Lefranc. Her parents, Sadie (née Forbert) and Joseph Rubin, were Polish Jews, her father from Warsaw and her mother from the local countryside.  She graduated from Radcliffe College.

Career
Diana Trilling was a reviewer for The Nation magazine. Her works include We Must March My Darlings (1977), an essay collection; Mrs. Harris (1981), a study of and meditation on the trial of Jean Harris; and The Beginning of the Journey (1993), a memoir of her life and marriage to Lionel Trilling.

She was elected a Fellow of the American Academy of Arts and Sciences in 1976.

Cultural impact
Carolyn Heilbrun wrote about Trilling in her own final memoirs, When Men Were the Only Models We Had (2002). In his 1986 essay collection The Moronic Inferno, Martin Amis discusses the experience of meeting Trilling and her impact on New York City:
In New York, Diana Trilling is regarded with the suspicious awe customarily reserved for the city's senior literary ladies. Whenever I announced my intention of going along to interview her, people looked at me with trepidation, a new respect, a certain holy dread. I felt I was about to enter the lion's den — or the den of the literary lionness, which is often just as dangerous.

References

Further reading
  Natalie Robins: The untold journey : the life of Diana Trilling, New York : Columbia University Press, [2017],

External links

The New York Times obituary dated October 15, 1996
The New York Times review dated October 24, 1993, of autobiography The Beginning of the Journey (article title:  "It's Complicated... It's Very Complicated")
National Review obituary dated November 25, 1996.
The New Yorker reassessment dated May 29, 2017, "The Feuds of Diana Trilling:  As a New York intellectual, she lived to battle her adversaries. Was her beloved husband among them?"
 
Finding aid to Abraham Anderson interviews with Diana Trilling at Columbia University. Rare Book & Manuscript Library.
Finding aid to Diana Trilling papers at Columbia University. Rare Book & Manuscript Library.

1905 births
1996 deaths
Analysands of Ruth Mack Brunswick
American people of Polish-Jewish descent
Place of birth missing
Place of death missing
Fellows of the American Academy of Arts and Sciences
Jewish American writers
20th-century American writers
20th-century American women writers
Radcliffe College alumni
20th-century American Jews